Dr. Rafael Royo-Torres is a Spanish Paleontologist. He works in Fundación Conjunto Paleontológico de Teruel-Dinópolis, in Teruel, Spain. He is one of the discoverers of Turiasaurus riodevensis, together with Luis Alcalá and Alberto Cobos.

References

External links
 BBC report on Turiasaurus
 Fundación Conjunto Paleontológico de Teruel

Living people
Spanish paleontologists
Year of birth missing (living people)